Ante Mitrović (born 1 April 1988) is a Croatian footballer who last played for Metalac Gornji Milanovac.

Career
On 17 April 2015 Mitrović left Slovenian football club Zavrč after only four months.

On 17 July 2016 he made his debut in the Serbian SuperLiga with FK Metalac Gornji Milanovac.

Honours
NK Zagreb
Croatian Second League: 2013–14

References

1988 births
Living people
Sportspeople from Zadar
Association football forwards
Croatian footballers
NK Zadar players
NK Zagreb players
FC Koper players
NK Zavrč players
HNK Gorica players
FK Metalac Gornji Milanovac players
Croatian Football League players
First Football League (Croatia) players
Slovenian PrvaLiga players
Serbian SuperLiga players
Croatian expatriate footballers
Expatriate footballers in Germany
Croatian expatriate sportspeople in Germany
Expatriate footballers in Slovenia
Croatian expatriate sportspeople in Slovenia
Expatriate footballers in Serbia
Croatian expatriate sportspeople in Serbia